Marahoué Region is one of the 31 regions of Ivory Coast and is one of two regions in Sassandra-Marahoué District. The region's seat is Bouaflé. The region's area is 8,680 km², and its population in the 2021 census was 981,180.

Departments
Marahoué Region is currently divided into three departments: Bouaflé, Sinfra, and Zuénoula.

History

Marahoué Region was created in 1997 as a first-level administrative region of the country. In 2000, Oumé Department was split off from Marahoué and combined with Gagnoa Department from Haut-Sassandra Region to form Fromager Region.

As part of the 2011 administrative reorganisation of the subdivisions of Ivory Coast, Marahoué was converted into a second-level administrative region and became part of the new first-level Sassandra-Marahoué District. No territorial changes were made to Haut-Sassandra as a result of the reorganisation.

Notes

 
Regions of Sassandra-Marahoué District
1997 establishments in Ivory Coast
States and territories established in 1997